PalaFantozzi is an indoor sporting arena that is located in Capo d'Orlando, Italy. The arena is named after former Italian professional basketball player, Alessandro Fantozzi. The seating capacity of the arena is 3,613 people.

History
PalaFantozzi originally opened in 2001, and was renovated and expanded in 2005. It has been used as the regular home arena of the Italian League professional basketball club, Orlandina Basket.

References

External links
Image 1 of PalaFantozzi Interior
Image 2 of PalaFantozzi Interior
Image 3 of PalaFantozzi Interior

Basketball venues in Italy
Indoor arenas in Italy
Capo d'Orlando